Eshback, Pennsylvania is a ghost town in Lehman Township, Pike County, Pennsylvania near Dingmans Ferry, Pennsylvania and Bushkill, Pennsylvania. It is now a part of the Delaware Water Gap National Recreation Area, and the Eshback Boat Launch remains in the park.

Ghost towns in Pennsylvania
Geography of Pike County, Pennsylvania
Pocono Mountains